Lisa A. Rossbacher is an American scientist, writer and academic administrator. She is the president emerita of Southern Polytechnic State University and the outgoing President of Humboldt State University. She served as president of Southern Polytechnic State University from August 1998 to June 30, 2014. A geologist, writer, professor, former Vice Chancellor of the University System of Georgia, and community leader, she is also a past Chair of Metro Atlanta's Cobb Chamber of Commerce, an author of several books on geology, and a Geotimes Magazine columnist.

Personal life and education
Rossbacher was born in Fredericksburg, VA, and resided in Dahlgren, Virginia during her childhood.  Employed by the U.S. Defense Department, her father performed research for the then Naval Weapons Lab while her mother managed domestic duties at home for Lisa and her two younger siblings.

Rossbacher is married to Dallas D. Rhodes, the former Department Chair of Geology and Geography at Georgia Southern University.

Rossbacher studied at Dickinson College, where she earned a Bachelor of Science in Geology.  She attended graduate school at the State University of New York at Binghamton and received a Master of Arts in Geological Sciences. Rossbacher completed her academic studies at Princeton University, receiving both a M.A. and PhD in Geological and Geophysical Science.

Early career

Throughout her academic studies and prior to her appointment at Southern Polytechnic State University, Rossbacher had worked for various government and non-profit institutions.  She performed research for NASA as an Astronaut Candidate, and provided services for National Public Radio, and the U.S. Geological Survey. She served as Dean of the College at Dickinson College prior to her appointment as president at Southern Polytechnic State University.

President of Southern Polytechnic State University
In 1998, the Board of Regents of the University System of Georgia appointed Rossbacher as the second president of Southern Polytechnic State University.  As president of SPSU, Rossbacher was the chief officer and spokesperson of the second largest engineering technology university in the nation. Southern Polytechnic State University was founded in 1948 as a two-year division of Georgia Tech, and was organized as an independent university in the early 1980s.

Rossbacher focused many of her leadership efforts on environmental sustainability by gearing the university's campus towards a greener environment through its operations and structure.  In 2007, Rossbacher partnered the university with the American College and University presidents' Climate Commitment, sponsored by the Association for the Advancement of Sustainability in Higher Education. This commitment focuses on the leadership and action on climate change by providing support for colleges to evolve into climate neutral institutions and become role models for their communities.  In 2008, the University broke ground on a new Engineering Technology Center and the expansion on the Studio Building, built in 1961. Rossbacher's commitment to sustainability influenced the construction plans, enabling them to be designed to meet the certification requirements established by the Leadership in Energy and Environmental Design Green Building Rating System.

Rossbacher is also credited with increasing enrollment and retention by an average of 20% each, adding eight new degrees, and commissioning five new buildings on campus.

9/11 Controversy

The Southern Polytechnic State University campus never closed, and classes were never cancelled, during the September 11 attacks. On September 11th, 2001 Rossbacher contacted campus police "around eleven-ish" after the second tower collapsed. No campus bulletins were issued. Dr. Rossbacher and University Police Captain George Scott later argued that there was no threat to the Southern Polytechnic State University campus, despite the fact that the campus is located next to Dobbins Air Reserve Base.

Works
As a scientist for NASA, she focused her research interests on the role of water and water ice on Mars

Books
 Career Opportunities in Geology and the Earth Sciences
 Recent Revolutions in Geology
 Geomedia: A Guide for Geoscientists who meet the Press (with Rex Buchanan)
 Physical Geology: the Lab Manual (with geology faculty members at Princeton University and Whittier College)

Awards and honors
 Woman of the Year (2007), Cobb County Branch of the American Association of University Women

See also
 Georgia Board of Regents
 Southern Polytechnic State University
 University System of Georgia
 Student Advisory Council of Georgia

References

External links
Geological Society of America
SPACE FACTS
Turknett.com
The New Georgia Encyclopedia

Southern Polytechnic State University
American women academics
Women earth scientists
American earth scientists
Living people
Year of birth missing (living people)
21st-century American women